St. Peter's Basilica is a church in Vatican City.

St. Peter's Basilica may also refer to:

 Cathedral Basilica of Saint Peter in Chains (Cincinnati), U.S.
 Đakovo Cathedral, or Cathedral basilica of St. Peter, in Croatia
 Frascati Cathedral, or Cathedral Basilica of St. Peter Apostle, in Italy
 Old St. Peter's Basilica, where the new St. Peter's Basilica stands today in Vatican City
 St. Peter's Basilica, Guimarães, Portugal
 St. Peter's Basilica Church, Stari Trg, Kosovo
 St Peter's Cathedral Basilica, Kumasi, Ghana
 St. Peter's Cathedral Basilica (London, Ontario), Canada

See also
 St. Peter's Cathedral (disambiguation)
 St. Peter's Church (disambiguation)